Delete is a miniseries about a reporter and a young hacker who uncovers an artificial intelligence which has become sentient.

Cast 
 Keir Gilchrist as Daniel
 Erin Karpluk as Jesse Taylor
 Ryan Robbins as Agent Max Hollis
 Gil Bellows as Lt. General Michael Overson
 Matt Frewer as National Security Advisor Arthur Bowden
 Janet Kidder as Deputy Director Elizabeth Hardington
 Theresa Russell as Fiona
 Blu Mankuma as General Cassius Giles, USAF
 Andrew Airlie as Director Marcus Tremaine
 Seth Green as Lucifer
 Jaylee Hamidi as Keiko Watanabe (1 episode, 2013)
 Mike Azevedo  as Pierre Garaneuf (1 episode, 2013)
 Mehdi Darvish as Plant Technician (1 episode, 2013)
 Graeme Duffy  as Desmond Smith (1 episode, 2013)
 John Stewart  as Train Conductor (1 episode, 2013)
 Alexander von Roon as Financial Reporter (1 episode, 2013)

Plot 
Delete imagines a disaster in our all-too-fragile digital world where the Internet becomes dangerously self-aware with one systematic purpose, to protect itself and destroy mankind. Faced with possible extinction, there is only one way out – create a second artificial intelligence, just as powerful, just as intelligent and just as dangerous, as the only possible solution able to combat it - but with governments in a panic and the whole world in chaos, are they even able to match this unprecedented foe...?

Production details 
Written and distributed by Sonar Entertainment of New York City, the series consists of two feature-length episodes. It was shot on location in Vancouver and produced by Vancouver-based Brightlight Pictures.

Reception 

The series won two Leo Awards, from the Motion Picture Arts & Sciences Foundation of British Columbia, for Best Picture Editing and Best Television Movie.

References

External links

2010s American drama television miniseries
2010s American science fiction television series
2012 American television series debuts
2013 American television series endings
Television series about artificial intelligence